Marked Men can refer to:

 Marked Men (1919 film), an American Western film directed by John Ford
 Marked Men (1940 film), an American crime film
 The Marked Men, an American band
 The Marked Men (album), an album by the above band

See also
 A Marked Man, a 1917 American silent film